The Franz Edelman Award for Achievement in Operations Research and the Management Sciences recognizes excellence in the execution of operations research on the organizational level.

About
The award is presented annually by the Institute for Operations Research and the Management Sciences (INFORMS).

The international competition pits six teams from industry, government, healthcare, and the non-profit sectors. The competition takes place at the INFORMS Business Analytics Conference and concludes with the announcement of the winner at a gala dinner at the conference. It began in 1971 as the TIMS Prize and was named for Franz Edelman, the operations research director of RCA, shortly after his death in 1982. It carries a cash award of $10,000. Since its inception, nearly $250 billion in benefits have been tabulated among Franz Edelman Award finalist teams. Following the competition, INFORMS publishes papers by the Edelman finalists in the January issue of the INFORMS journal Interfaces.

List of recent winners 
 2022: Chile: Achievement in Advanced Analytics, Operations Research and Management Science for its use of operations research (O.R.) to improve response strategies to the COVID-19 pandemic.
 2021: United Nations World Food Programme: Towards Zero Hunger with Analytics
 2020: Intel: Intel Realizes $25 Billion by Applying Advanced Analytics from Product Architecture Design Through Supply Chain Planning
 2019: Louisville Metropolitan Sewer District (MSD) : Analytics and Optimization Reduce Sewage Overflows to Protect Community Waterways in Kentucky
 2018: FCC : Unlocking the Beachfront: Using O.R. to Repurpose Wireless Spectrum
 2017: Holiday Retirement and Prorize : Revenue Management Provides Double-digit Revenue Lift for Holiday Retirement
 2016: United Parcel Service (UPS): UPS On Road Integrated Optimization and Navigation (Orion) Project
 2015: Syngenta: Advanced Analytics for Agricultural Product Development
 2014: U.S. Centers for Disease Control and Prevention (CDC): Polio Eradicators Use Integrated Analytical Models to Make Better Decisions 
 2013: Delta Commissioner of the Netherlands: Economically Efficient Flood Standards to Protect the Netherlands against Flooding
 2012: TNT Express: Supply Chain-Wide Optimization at TNT Express
 2011: MISO: Operations Research Ramps Up the Power Market in the Midwest
 2010: INDEVAL: application of operations research and analytics to speedily processing complex securities transactions (led by Omar Romero-Hernandez).
 2009: Hewlett-Packard: HP Transforms Product Portfolio Management with Operations Research
 2008: Netherlands Railways: The New Dutch Timetable—the OR Revolution
 2007: Memorial Sloan-Kettering Cancer Center: Operations Research Answers to Cancer Therapeutics
 2006: Warner Robins Air Logistics Center: Streamlining Aircraft Repair and Overhaul at Warner Robins Air Logistics Center
 2005: General Motors: General Motors Increases Its Production Throughput
 2004: Motorola Inc: Reinventing the Supplier Negotiation Process at Motorola
 2003: Canadian Pacific Railway (First-Place Winner): Perfecting the Scheduled Railroad- Model-Driven Operating Plan Development
 2002: Continental Airlines: A New Era for Crew Recovery at Continental Airlines
 2001: Merrill Lynch, Inc: Pricing Analysis for Merrill Lynch Integrated Choice
 2000: Jeppesen Sanderson, Inc.: Flexible Planning and Technology Management at Jeppesen Sanderson, Inc.

See also

 List of mathematics awards

References

External links 
 Holiday Retirement 
 Franz Edelman Award website

Management science
Mathematics awards
Operations research
Awards established in 1971